Capitellum is a genus of skinks. Species were previously placed in the genus Mabuya. All species in this genus are considered possibly extinct, due to a lack of recent sightings but the presence of potential refuges.

Species
The following 3 species, listed alphabetically by specific name, are recognized as being valid:

Capitellum mariagalantae Hedges & Conn, 2012 – Marie-Galante skink  (possibly extinct)
Capitellum metallicum (Bocourt, 1879) – lesser Martinique skink  (possibly extinct)
Capitellum parvicruzae Hedges & Conn, 2012 – lesser Saint Croix skink  (possibly extinct)

Nota bene: A binomial authority in parentheses indicates that the species was originally described in a genus other than Capitellum.

References

 
Lizard genera
Taxa named by Stephen Blair Hedges
Taxa named by Caitlin E. Conn